Theodore O'Hara Sechrist (February 10, 1876 – April 2, 1950) was a professional baseball player. He was a pitcher who played for the New York Giants of the National League in one game, on April 28, 1899. He faced two batters and walked both of them. Because they did not score and he did not record an out, he has no official ERA from his appearance. In addition to his brief major league appearance, he played in the minor leagues from 1895 through 1904. He is buried in the Somerset City Cemetery, Somerset, Kentucky, with his wife, Gertrude.

References

1876 births
1950 deaths
Major League Baseball pitchers
Baseball players from Kentucky
New York Giants (NL) players
19th-century baseball players
Chattanooga Warriors players
Mobile Bluebirds players
Atlanta Crackers players
New Orleans Pelicans (baseball) players
Norfolk Braves players
Norfolk Jewels players
New Bedford Whalers (baseball) players
New Bedford Browns players
Bristol Bell Makers players
Waterbury Rough Riders players
Hartford Indians players
Bristol Bellmakers players
Wooden Nutmegs players
Selma Christians players
Columbus Senators players
Augusta Tourists players
Savannah Pathfinders players
People from Williamstown, Kentucky